Royal intermarriage is the practice of members of ruling dynasties marrying into other reigning families. It was more commonly done in the past as part of strategic diplomacy for national interest. Although sometimes enforced by legal requirement on persons of royal birth, more often it has been a matter of political policy or tradition in monarchies.

In Europe, the practice was most prevalent from the medieval era until the outbreak of World War I, but evidence of intermarriage between royal dynasties in other parts of the world can be found as far back as the Late Bronze Age. Monarchs were often in pursuit of national and international aggrandisement on behalf of themselves and their dynasties, thus bonds of kinship tended to promote or restrain aggression. Marriage between dynasties could serve to initiate, reinforce or guarantee peace between nations. Alternatively, kinship by marriage could secure an alliance between two dynasties which sought to reduce the sense of threat from or to initiate aggression against the realm of a third dynasty. It could also enhance the prospect of territorial acquisition for a dynasty by procuring legal claim to a foreign throne, or portions of its realm (e.g., colonies), through inheritance from an heiress whenever a monarch failed to leave an undisputed male heir.

In parts of Europe, royalty continued to regularly marry into the families of their greatest vassals as late as the 16th century. More recently, they have tended to marry internationally. In other parts of the world royal intermarriage was less prevalent and the number of instances varied over time, depending on the culture and foreign policy of the era.

By continent/country

While the contemporary Western ideal sees marriage as a unique bond between two people who are in love, families in which heredity is central to power or inheritance (such as royal families) have often seen marriage in a different light. There are often political or other non-romantic functions that must be served and the relative wealth and power of the potential spouses may be considered. Marriage for political, economic, or diplomatic reasons, the marriage of state, was a pattern seen for centuries among European rulers.

Africa
At times, marriage between members of the same dynasty has been common in Central Africa.

In West Africa, the sons and daughters of Yoruba kings were traditionally given in marriage to their fellow royals as a matter of dynastic policy. Sometimes these marriages would involve members of other tribes. Erinwinde of Benin, for example, was taken as a wife by the Oba Oranyan of Oyo during his time as governor of Benin. Their son Eweka went on to found the dynasty that rules the Kingdom of Benin.

Marriages between the Swazi, Zulu and Thembu royal houses of southern Africa are common. For example, the daughter of South African president and Thembu royal Nelson Mandela, Zenani Mandela, married Prince Thumbumuzi Dlamini, a brother of Mswati III, King of Eswatini. Elsewhere in the region, Princess Semane Khama of the Bamangwato tribe of Botswana married Kgosi Lebone Edward Molotlegi of the Bafokeng tribe of South Africa.

Other examples of historical, mythical and contemporary royal intermarriages throughout Africa include:
 Princess Mantfombi Dlamini, sister of Mswati III of Eswatini, and Goodwill Zwelithini, King of the Zulus, as his chief queen consort
 Maxhob'ayakhawuleza Sandile, King of Rharhabe Xhosas, and Noloyiso Sandile, the daughter of King Cyprian Bhekuzulu of the Zulus.
 The Toucouleur emperor Umar Tall and Princess Maryem, the daughter of Sultan Muhammed Bello of Sokoto
 Chief Nfundu Bolulengwe Mtirara of the Thembu people, a great-nephew of Nelson Mandela, and Princess Nandi of Zululand, a granddaughter of King Goodwill Zwelithini.
 Fadlallah, son of Shehu Rabih az-Zubayr of Borno, and Khadija, a daughter of Sheik Mohammed al-Mahdi al-Sanusi of the Senoussi people.
 Princess Owawejokun, a daughter of the Owa Atakumosa of Ijeshaland, and Ogoro, the Ajapada of Akure.
 Oranyan, the Alaafin of Oyo, and Torosi, a princess of the Nupe people.

Ancient Egypt

Several Egyptian pharaohs married the daughters of neighbouring kings to secure peace and form alliances.  The Egyptian-Hittite peace treaty, the earliest known surviving peace treaty in the world, was sealed by a marriage between the pharaoh Ramesses II and a Hittite princess.  Pharaoh Amasis II married a Greek princess named Ladice daughter of King Battus III of Cyrene.

Pharaoh Amenhotep III alone is known to have married several foreign women:
 Gilukhepa, the daughter of Shuttarna II of Mitanni, in the tenth year of his reign.
 Tadukhepa, the daughter of his ally Tushratta of Mitanni, Around Year 36 of his reign.
 A daughter of Kurigalzu, king of Babylon.
 A daughter of Kadashman-Enlil, king of Babylon.
 A daughter of Tarhundaradu, ruler of Arzawa.
 A daughter of the ruler of Ammia (in modern Syria).

Asia

Thailand
The Chakri dynasty of Thailand has included marriages between royal relatives, but marriages between dynasties and foreigners, including foreign royals, are rare. This is in part due to Section 11 of 1924 Palace Law of Succession which excludes members of the royal family from the line of succession if they marry a non-Thai national.

The late king Bhumibol Adulyadej was a first-cousin once removed of his wife, Sirikit, the two being, respectively, a grandson and a great-granddaughter of Chulalongkorn. Chulalongkorn married a number of his half-sisters, including Savang Vadhana and Sunandha Kumariratana; all shared the same father, Mongkut. He also married Dara Rasmi, a princess of a vassal state.

Vietnam
The Lý dynasty which ruled Dai Viet (Vietnam) married its princesses off to regional rivals to establish alliances with them. One of these marriages was between a Lý empress regnant (Lý Chiêu Hoàng) and a member of fishermen-turned-warlords Trần clan (Trần Thái Tông) from Nam Định, which enabled the Trần to then topple the Lý and established their own Trần dynasty.

A Lý princess also married into the Hồ clan faction, which later usurped power and established the Hồ dynasty after having a Tran princess marry their leader, Hồ Quý Ly.

Cambodia
The Cambodian King Chey Chettha II married the Vietnamese Nguyễn lord Princess Nguyễn Thị Ngọc Vạn, a daughter of Lord Nguyễn Phúc Nguyên, in 1618. In return, the king granted the Vietnamese the right to establish settlements in Mô Xoài (now Bà Rịa), in the region of Prey Nokor—which they colloquially referred to as Sài Gòn, and which later became Ho Chi Minh City.

India 
In the Chola dynasty in southern India, Madhurantaki the daughter of Emperor Rajendra II married Kulottunga I the son the son of Eastern Chalukya ruler Rajaraja Narendra. This was to improve the relationship between the two royal houses and to straighten Chola influence in Vengai. Kulottunga and Madhurantaki were first cousins as Kulottunga's mother Amangai Devi was the sister of Rajendra II making them both the grandchildren of Emperor Rajendra I.

China

Marriage policy in imperial China differed from dynasty to dynasty. Several dynasties practiced Heqin, which involved marrying off princesses to other royal families.

The Xiongnu practiced marriage alliances with Han dynasty officers and officials who defected to their side. The older sister of the Chanyu (the Xiongnu ruler) was married to the Xiongnu general Zhao Xin, the Marquis of Xi who was serving the Han dynasty. The daughter of the Chanyu was married to the Han Chinese general Li Ling after he surrendered and defected. The Yenisei Kirghiz Khagans claimed descent from Li Ling. Another Han Chinese general who defected to the Xiongnu was Li Guangli who also married a daughter of the Chanyu.

The Xianbei Tuoba royal family of Northern Wei started to arrange for Han Chinese elites to marry daughters of the royal family in the 480s. Some Han Chinese exiled royalty fled from southern China and defected to the Xianbei. Several daughters of the Xianbei Emperor Xiaowen of Northern Wei were married to Han Chinese elites, the Han Chinese Liu Song royal Liu Hui 劉輝, married Princess Lanling 蘭陵公主 of the Northern Wei, Princess Huayang 華陽公主 to Sima Fei 司馬朏, a descendant of Jin dynasty (266–420) royalty, Princess Jinan 濟南公主 to Lu Daoqian 盧道虔, Princess Nanyang 南陽長公主 to Xiao Baoyin 蕭寶夤, a member of Southern Qi royalty. Emperor Xiaozhuang of Northern Wei's sister the Shouyang Princess was wedded to The Liang dynasty ruler Emperor Wu of Liang's son Xiao Zong 蕭綜.

When the Eastern Jin dynasty ended Northern Wei received the Jin prince Sima Chuzhi 司馬楚之 as a refugee. A Northern Wei Princess married Sima Chuzhi, giving birth to Sima Jinlong. Northern Liang King Juqu Mujian's daughter married Sima Jinlong.

The Rouran Khaganate arranged for one of their princesses, Khagan Yujiulü Anagui's daughter Princess Ruru 蠕蠕公主 to be married to the Han Chinese ruler Gao Huan of the Eastern Wei.

The Kingdom of Gaochang was made out of Han Chinese colonists and ruled by the Han Chinese Qu family which originated from Gansu. Jincheng commandery 金城 (Lanzhou), district of Yuzhong 榆中 was the home of the Qu Jia. The Qu family was linked by marriage alliances to the Turks, with a Turk being the grandmother of King Qu Boya.

Tang dynasty (618–907) emperors exchanged and the rulers of the Uyghur Khaganate exchanged princesses in marriage to consolidate the special trade and military relationship that developed after the Khaganate supported the Chinese during the An Lushan Rebellion. The Uyghur Khaganate exchanged princesses in marriage with Tang dynasty China in 756 to seal the alliance against An Lushan. The Uyghur Khagan Bayanchur Khan had his daughter Uyghur Princess Pijia (毗伽公主) married to Tang dynasty Chinese Prince Li Chengcai (李承采), Prince of Dunhuang (敦煌王), son of Li Shouli, Prince of Bin, while the Tang dynasty Chinese princess Ninguo married Uyghur Khagan Bayanchur. At least three Tang imperial princesses are known to have married khagans between 758 and 821. These unions temporarily stopped in 788, which is believed in part to be because stability within the Chinese empire meant that they were politically unnecessary; however, threats from Tibet in the west, and a renewed need for Uyghur support, precipitated the marriage of Princess Taihe to Bilge Khagan.

The ethnically Chinese Cao family ruling Guiyi Circuit established marriage alliances with the Uighurs of the Ganzhou Kingdom, with both the Cao rulers marrying Uighur princesses and with Cao princesses marrying Uighur rulers. The Ganzhou Uighur Khagan's daughter was married to Cao Yijin in 916.

The Chinese Cao family ruling Guiyi Circuit established marriage alliances with the Saka Kingdom of Khotan, with both the Cao rulers marrying Khotanese princesses and with Cao princesses marrying Khotanese rulers. A Khotanese princess who was the daughter of the King of Khotan married Cao Yanlu.

The Khitan Liao dynasty arranged for women from the Khitan royal consort Xiao clan to marry members of the Han Chinese Han 韓 clan, which originated in Jizhou 冀州 before being abducted by the Khitan and becoming part of the Han Chinese elite of the Liao.

Han Chinese Geng family intermarried with the Khitan and the Han 韓 clan provided two of their women as wives to Geng Yanyi and the second one was the mother of Geng Zhixin. Empress Rende's sister, a member of the Xiao clan, was the mother of Han Chinese General Geng Yanyi.

Han Durang (Yelu Longyun) was the father of Queen dowager of State Chen, who was the wife of General Geng Yanyi and buried with him in his tomb in Zhaoyang in Liaoning. His wife was also known as "Madame Han". The Geng's tomb is located in Liaoning at Guyingzi in Chaoying.

Emperors of the proceeding Song dynasty (960–1279) tended to marry from within their own borders. Tang emperors, mainly took their wives from high-ranking bureaucratic families, but the Song dynasty did not consider rank important when it came to selecting their consorts. It has been estimated that only a quarter of Song consorts were from such families, with the rest being from lower status backgrounds. For example, Liu, consort of Emperor Zhenzong, had been a street performer and consort Miao, wife of Emperor Renzong was the daughter of his own wet nurse.

During the Qing dynasty (1644–1912), emperors chose their consorts primarily from one of the eight Banner families, administrative divisions that divide all native Manchu families. To maintain the ethnic purity of the ruling dynasty, after the Kangxi Period (1662–1722), emperors and princes were forbidden to marry non-Manchu and non-Mongol wives. Imperial daughters however were not covered by this ban, and as with their preceding dynasties, were often married to Mongol princes to gain political or military support, especially in the early years of the Qing dynasty; three of the nine daughters of Emperor Nurhaci and twelve of Emperor Hongtaiji's daughters were married to Mongol princes.

The Manchu imperial Aisin Gioro clan practiced marriage alliances with Han Chinese Ming generals and Mongol princes. Aisin Gioro women were married to Han Chinese generals who defected to the Manchu side during the Manchu conquest of China. The Manchu leader Nurhaci married one of his granddaughters to the Ming general Li Yongfang (李永芳) after he surrendered Fushun in Liaoning to the Manchu in 1618 and a mass marriage of Han Chinese officers and officials to Manchu women numbering 1,000 couples was arranged by Prince Yoto 岳托 (Prince Keqin) and Hongtaiji in 1632 to promote harmony between the two ethnic groups. Aisin Gioro women were married to the sons of the Han Chinese generals Sun Sike (Sun Ssu-k'o) 孫思克, Geng Jimao (Keng Chi-mao), Shang Kexi (Shang K'o-hsi), and Wu Sangui (Wu San-kuei).

Nurhaci's son Abatai's daughter was married to Li Yongfang. The offspring of Li received the "Third Class Viscount" title. Li Yongfang was the great-great-great-grandfather of Li Shiyao 李侍堯.

The "efu" 額駙 rank was given to husbands of Qing princesses. Geng Zhongming, a Han bannerman, was awarded the title of Prince Jingnan, and his son Geng Jingmao managed to have both his sons Geng Jingzhong and Geng Zhaozhong 耿昭忠 become court attendants under the Shunzhi Emperor and married Aisin Gioro women, with Prince Abatai's granddaughter marrying Geng Zhaozhong 耿昭忠 and Haoge's (a son of Hong Taiji) daughter marrying Geng Jingzhong. A daughter 和硕柔嘉公主 of the Manchu Aisin Gioro Prince Yolo 岳樂 (Prince An) was wedded to Geng Juzhong 耿聚忠 who was another son of Geng Jingmao.

The fourteenth daughter of Kangxi (和硕悫靖公主) was wedded to Sun Chengen, the son (孫承恩) of Sun Sike (Sun Ssu-k'o) 孫思克, a Han bannerman.

Korea

The Silla Kingdom had a practice that limited the succession to the throne to members of the seonggol, or "sacred bone", rank. To maintain their "sacred bone" rank, members of this caste often intermarried with one another in the same fashion that European royals intermarried to maintain a "pure" royal pedigree.

The Goryeo dynasty had a history of incestuous marriage within the royal family in its early years, starting from Gwangjong, the fourth king, who married his half-sister Queen Daemok. To avoid scandals, the female members of the dynasty would be ceremonially adopted by their maternal families after birth. This practice of dynastic incest ended with the overthrow of Queen Heonae, the mother of Mokjong, the seventh king, after she attempted to seize the throne for herself and her illegitimate sons by placing these sons as Mokjong's heir, only to be foiled by a coup masterminded by the Goryeo general Gang Jo.

After the Second Manchu invasion of Korea, Joseon Korea was forced to give several of their royal princesses as concubines to the Qing Manchu regent Prince Dorgon. In 1650, Dorgon married the Korean Princess Uisun (義順). She was a collateral branch of the Korean royal family, and daughter of Yi Gae-yun (李愷胤). Dorgon married two Korean princesses at Lianshan.

Japan
The Japanese may not have seen intermarriage between them and the royal dynasties of the Korean Empire damaging to their prestige either. According to the Shoku Nihongi, an imperially commissioned record of Japanese history completed in 797, Emperor Kanmu who ruled from 781 to 806 was the son of a Korean concubine, Takano no Niigasa, who was descended from King Muryeong of Baekje, one of the Three Kingdoms of Korea.

In 1920, Crown Prince Yi Un of Korea married Princess Masako of Nashimoto and, in May 1931, Yi Geon, grandson of Gojong of Korea, was married to Matsudaira Yosiko, a cousin of Princess Masako. The Japanese saw these marriages as a way to secure their colonial rule of Korea and introduce Japanese blood in to the Korean royal House of Yi.

Europe

Medieval and Early Modern Europe
Careful selection of a spouse was important to maintain the royal status of a family: depending on the law of the land in question, if a prince or king was to marry a commoner who had no royal blood, even if the first-born was acknowledged as a son of a sovereign, he might not be able to claim any of the royal status of his father.

Traditionally, many factors were important in arranging royal marriages. One such factor was the amount of territory that the other royal family governed or controlled. Another, related factor was the stability of the control exerted over that territory: when there was territorial instability in a royal family, other royalty would be less inclined to marry into that family. Another factor was political alliance: marriage was an important way to bind together royal families and their countries during peace and war and could justify many important political decisions.

The increase in royal intermarriage often meant that lands passed into the hands of foreign houses, when the nearest heir was the son of a native dynasty and a foreign royal. Given the success of the Habsburgs' territorial acquisition-via-inheritance, a motto came to be associated with their dynasty: Bella gerant alii, tu, felix Austria, nube! ("Let others wage war. You, happy Austria, marry!")

Monarchs sometimes went to great lengths to prevent this. On her marriage to Louis XIV of France, Maria Theresa, daughter of Philip IV of Spain, was forced to renounce her claim to the Spanish throne. When monarchs or heirs apparent wed other monarchs or heirs, special agreements, sometimes in the form of treaties, were negotiated to determine inheritance rights. The marriage contract of Philip II of Spain and Mary I of England, for example, stipulated that the maternal possessions, as well as Burgundy and the Low Countries, were to pass to any future children of the couple, whereas the remaining paternal possessions (including Spain, Naples, Sicily, Milan) would first of all go to Philip's son Don Carlos, from his previous marriage to Maria Manuela of Portugal. If Carlos were to die without any descendants, only then would they pass to the children of his second marriage. On the other hand, the Franco-Scottish treaty that arranged the 1558 marriage of Mary, Queen of Scots and Francis, the son and heir of Henry II of France, had it that if the queen died without descendants, Kingdom of Scotland would fall to the throne of Kingdom of France.

Religion has always been closely tied to European political affairs, and as such it played an important role during marriage negotiations. The 1572 wedding in Paris of the French princess Margaret of Valois to the leader of France's Huguenots, Henry III of Navarre, was ostensibly arranged to effect a rapprochement between the nation's Catholics and Protestants, but proved a ruse for the St. Bartholomew's Day massacre. After the English Reformation, matches between English monarchs and Roman Catholic princesses were often unpopular, especially so when the prospective queen consort was unwilling to convert, or at least practice her faith discreetly. Passage of the Act of Settlement 1701 disinherited any heir to the throne who married a Catholic. Other ruling houses, such as the Romanovs and Habsburgs, have at times also insisted on dynastic marriages only being contracted with people of a certain faith or those willing to convert. When in 1926 Astrid of Sweden married Leopold III of Belgium, it was agreed that her children would be raised as Catholics but she was not required to give up Lutheranism, although she chose to convert in 1930. Some potential matches were abandoned due to irreconcilable religious differences. For example, plans for the marriage of the Catholic Władysław IV Vasa and the Lutheran Elisabeth of Bohemia, Princess Palatine proved unpopular with Poland's largely Catholic nobility and were quietly dropped.

Marriages among ruling dynasties and their subjects have at times been common, with such alliances as that of Edward the Confessor, King of England with Edith of Wessex and Władysław II Jagiełło, King of Poland with Elizabeth Granowska being far from unheard of in medieval Europe. However, as dynasties approached absolutism and sought to preserve loyalty among competing members of the nobility, most eventually distanced themselves from kinship ties to local nobles by marrying abroad. Marriages with subjects brought the king back down to the level of those he ruled, often stimulating the ambition of his consort's family and evoking jealousy—or disdain—from the nobility. The notion that monarchs should marry into the dynasties of other monarchs to end or prevent war was, at first, a policy driven by pragmatism. During the era of absolutism, this practice contributed to the notion that it was socially, as well as politically, disadvantageous for members of ruling families to intermarry with their subjects and pass over the opportunity for marriage into a foreign dynasty.

Ancient Rome
While Roman emperors almost always married wives who were also Roman citizens, the ruling families of the empire's client kingdoms in the Near East and North Africa often contracted marriages with other royal houses to consolidate their position. These marriages were often contracted with the approval, or even at the behest, of the Roman emperors themselves. Rome thought that such marriages promoted stability among their client states and prevented petty local wars that would disturb the Pax Romana. Glaphyra of Cappadocia was known to have contracted three such royal intermarriages: with Juba II&I, King of Numidia and Mauretania, Alexander of Judea and Herod Archelaus, Ethnarch of Samaria.

Other examples from the Ancient Roman era include:
 Polemon II, King of Pontus and Berenice of Judea. Polemon later married Julia Mamaea of Emesa, while Berenice was previously married to Herod of Chalcis.
 Aristobulus IV of Judea and Berenice of Judea
 Aristobulus Minor of Judea and Iotapa of Emesa
 Gaius Julius Alexander and Julia Iotapa
 Sohaemus of Emesa and Drusilla
 Tiberius Julius Aspurgus and Gepaepyris
 Cotys III and Antonia Tryphaena
 Tiberius Julius Aspurgus and Gepaepyris
 Herod Antipas and Phasaelis of Nabatea
 Iotapa and Sampsiceramus II of Emesa

Byzantine Empire

Though some emperors, such as Justin I and Justinian I, took low-born wives, dynastic intermarriages in imperial families were not unusual in the Byzantine Empire. Following the fall of Constantinople in 1204, the ruling families, the Laskarides and then the Palaiologoi, thought it prudent to marry into foreign dynasties. One early example is the marriage of John Doukas Vatatzes with Constance, the daughter of Emperor Frederick II of the Holy Roman Empire to seal their alliance. After establishing an alliance with the Mongols in 1263, Michael VIII Palaiologos married two of his daughters to Mongol khans to cement their agreement: his daughter   Euphrosyne Palaiologina was married to Nogai Khan of the Golden Horde, and his daughter Maria Palaiologina, was married to Abaqa Khan of the Ilkhanate. Later in the century, Andronikos II Palaiologos agreed marital alliances with Ghazan of the Ilkhanate and Toqta and Uzbeg of the Golden Horde, which were quickly followed by weddings with his daughters.

The Grand Komnenoi of the Empire of Trebizond were famed for marrying their daughters to their neighbours as acts of diplomacy. Theodora Megale Komnene, daughter of John IV, was married to Uzun Hassan, lord of the Aq Qoyunlu, to seal an alliance between the Empire and the so-called White Sheep. Although the alliance failed to save Trebizond from its eventual defeat, and despite being a devout Christian in a Muslim state, Theodora did manage to exercise a pervasive influence both in the domestic and foreign actions of her husband.  Their grandson Ismail I was the founder of the Safavid dynasty of Iran

Though usually made to strengthen the position of the empire, there are examples of interdynastic marriages destabilising the emperor's authority. When Emperor Andronikos II Palaiologos married his second wife, Eirene of Montferrat, in 1284 she caused a division in the Empire over her demand that her own sons share in imperial territory with, Michael, his son from his first marriage. She resorted to leaving Constantinople, the capital of the Byzantine Empire, and setting up her own court in the second city of the Empire, Thessalonica.

Post World War I era
In modern times, among European royalty at least, marriages between royal dynasties have become much rarer than they once were. This happens to avoid inbreeding, since many royal families share common ancestors, and therefore share much of the genetic pool. Members of Europe's dynasties increasingly married members of titled noble families, including George VI of the United Kingdom, Prince Henry, Duke of Gloucester, Mary, Princess Royal and Countess of Harewood, Prince Michael of Kent, Charles III of the United Kingdom, Baudouin of Belgium, Albert II of Belgium, Prince Amedeo of Belgium, Franz Joseph II, Prince of Liechtenstein, Hans-Adam II of Liechtenstein, Prince Constantin of Liechtenstein, Princess Nora of Liechtenstein (the Liechtensteins, originally an Austrian noble family, always married nobles much more often than royals), Gustaf VI Adolf of Sweden, Princess Désirée, Baroness Silfverschiöld, Infanta Pilar, Duchess of Badajoz, Infanta Elena, Duchess of Lugo, Princess Marie Adelaide of Luxembourg, Princess Marie Gabrielle of Luxembourg, Guillaume, Hereditary Grand Duke of Luxembourg, and Princess Charlotte, Duchess of Valentinois or untitled nobility as Philippe of Belgium and Beatrix of the Netherlands, and very often commoners, as Carl XVI Gustaf of Sweden, Victoria, Crown Princess of Sweden, Harald V of Norway, Haakon, Crown Prince of Norway, Henri of Luxembourg, Felipe VI of Spain, Willem-Alexander of the Netherlands, Margrethe II of Denmark, Frederik, Crown Prince of Denmark, William, Prince of Wales and Albert II of Monaco have done.

Among Europe's current kings, queens and heirs apparent, only Alois, Hereditary Prince of Liechtenstein married a member of a foreign dynasty, as did the abdicated Juan Carlos I of Spain.

Members of two reigning houses
Examples of royal intermarriage since 1918 include:

Prince Nikolaus of Liechtenstein and Princess Margaretha of Luxembourg (1982, most recent example of intermarriage between two European dynasties reigning at the time of the wedding)
Constantine II of Greece and Princess Anne-Marie of Denmark (1964)
Hereditary Grand Duke Jean of Luxembourg and Princess Joséphine-Charlotte of Belgium (1953)
Princess Elizabeth of the United Kingdom and Prince Philip of Greece and Denmark (1947)
Peter II of Yugoslavia and Princess Alexandra of Greece and Denmark (1944)
Prince Aimone, Duke of Spoleto and Princess Irene of Greece and Denmark (1939)
Crown Prince Frederick of Denmark and Princess Ingrid of Sweden (1935)
Prince George, Duke of Kent and Princess Marina of Greece and Denmark (1934)
Boris III of Bulgaria and Princess Giovanna of Italy (1930)
Umberto, Prince of Piedmont and Princess Marie José of Belgium (1930)
Crown Prince Olav of Norway and Princess Märtha of Sweden (1929)
Prince Leopold, Duke of Brabant and Princess Astrid of Sweden (1926)
Prince Paul of Yugoslavia and Princess Olga of Greece and Denmark (1923)
Alexander I of Yugoslavia and Princess Maria of Romania (1922)
Crown Prince Carol of Romania and Princess Helen of Greece and Denmark (1921)
Crown Prince George of Greece and Princess Elisabeth of Romania (1921)
Prince Axel of Denmark and Princess Margaretha of Sweden (1919)

Members of one reigning house and one non-reigning house
Examples since 1918 include:

Princess Caroline of Monaco and Ernst August, Prince of Hanover (1999)
Alois, Hereditary Prince of Liechtenstein and Duchess Sophie in Bavaria (1993)
Prince Gundakar of Liechtenstein and Princess Marie d'Orléans (1989)
Princess Astrid of Belgium and Archduke Lorenz of Austria-Este (1984)
Princess Marie-Astrid of Luxembourg and Archduke Carl Christian of Austria (1982)
Princess Barbara of Liechtenstein and Prince Alexander of Yugoslavia (1973)
Princess Benedikte of Denmark and Richard, Hereditary Prince of Sayn-Wittgenstein-Berleburg (1968) 
Princess Irene of the Netherlands and Prince Carlos Hugo of Parma (1964)
Princess Sophia of Greece and Denmark and Juan Carlos, Prince of Asturias (1962)
Princess Birgitta of Sweden and Prince Johann Georg of Hohenzollern (1961)
Prince Alexander of Liechtenstein and Princess Josephine of Löwenstein-Wertheim-Rosenberg (1961)
Princess Alix of Luxembourg and Prince Antoine de Ligne (1950) 
Prince Heinrich of Liechtenstein and Archduchess Elisabeth of Austria (1949)
Prince Karl Alfred of Liechtenstein and Archduchess Agnes Christina of Austria (1949)
Princess Eugénie of Greece and Denmark and Raimundo, 2nd Duke of Castel Duino (1949)
Prince Georg Hartmann of Liechtenstein and Duchess Maria Christina of Württemberg (1948)
Princess Sophie of Greece and Denmark and Prince George William of Hanover (1946)
Prince Hans-Moritz of Liechtenstein and Princess Clotilde of Thurn and Taxis (1944) 
Princess Maria Francesca of Savoy and Prince Luigi of Bourbon-Parma (1939)
Prince Eugenio, Duke of Ancona and Princess Lucia of Bourbon-Two Sicilies (1938)
Princess Eugénie of Greece and Denmark and Prince Dominik Rainer Radziwiłł (1938)
Crown Prince Paul of Greece and Princess Frederica of Hanover (1938)
Princess Feodora of Denmark and Prince Christian of Schaumburg-Lippe (1937)
Princess Juliana of the Netherlands and Prince Bernhard of Lippe-Biesterfeld (1936)
Prince Gustaf Adolf, Duke of Västerbotten and Princess Sibylla of Saxe-Coburg and Gotha (1932)
Princess Theodora of Greece and Denmark and Berthold, Margrave of Baden (1931)
Princess Ileana of Romania and Archduke Anton of Austria (1931)
Princess Margarita of Greece and Denmark and Gottfried, Hereditary Prince of Hohenlohe-Langenburg (1931)
Princess Cecilie of Greece and Denmark and Georg Donatus, Hereditary Grand Duke of Hesse (1931)
Princess Sophie of Greece and Denmark and Prince Christoph of Hesse (1930)
Princess Hilda of Luxembourg and Prince Adolph of Schwarzenberg (1930)
Prince Christopher of Greece and Denmark and Princess Françoise of Orléans (1929)
Prince Filiberto, Duke of Pistoia and Princess Lydia d'Arenberg (1928)
Prince Amedeo, Duke of Apulia and Princess Anne of Orléans (1927)
Princess Mafalda of Savoy and Prince Philipp of Hesse (1925)
Princess Nadezhda of Bulgaria and Duke Albrecht Eugen of Württemberg (1924)
Princess Elisabeth of Luxembourg and Prince Ludwig Philipp of Thurn and Taxis (1922)
Princess Margaret of Denmark and Prince René of Bourbon-Parma (1921)
Princess Sophie of Luxembourg and Prince Ernst Heinrich of Saxony (1921)
Princess Antonia of Luxembourg and Rupprecht, Crown Prince of Bavaria (1921)
Prince Karl Aloys of Liechtenstein and Princess Elisabeth of Urach (1921)
Princess Maria Bona of Savoy-Genoa and Prince Konrad of Bavaria (1921)
Charlotte, Grand Duchess of Luxembourg and Prince Felix of Bourbon-Parma (1919)

Modern examples of dynastic intra-marriage
Examples since 1918 include:
	
Prince Knud of Denmark and Princess Caroline-Mathilde of Denmark (1933) 

As a result of dynastic intra-marriage all of Europe's 10 currently reigning hereditary monarchs since 1939 descend from a common ancestor, John William Friso, Prince of Orange. This remained true until 2022 when Louis IX, Landgrave of Hesse-Darmstadt became the new most recent common ancestor when Charles III became King of the United Kingdom.

Muslim world

Al-Andalus
From the time of the Umayyad conquest of Hispania and throughout the Reconquista, marriage between Spanish and Umayyad royals was not uncommon. Early marriages, such as that of Abd al-Aziz ibn Musa and Egilona at the turn of the 8th century, was thought to help establish the legitimacy of Muslim rule on the Iberian Peninsula. Later instances of intermarriage were often made to seal trade treaties between Christian kings and Muslim caliphs.

Ottoman Empire
The marriages of Ottoman sultans and their sons in the fourteenth and fifteenth centuries tended to be with members of the ruling dynasties of neighbouring powers. With little regard for religion, the sultans contracted marriages with both Christians and Muslims; the purpose of these royal intermarriages were purely tactical. Christian consorts of Ottoman sultans include Theodora Kantakouzene of Byzantium, Kera Tamara of Bulgaria and Olivera Despina of Serbia.  These Christian states along with Muslim beyliks of Germiyan, Saruhan, Karaman and Dulkadir were all potential enemies, and marriage was seen as a way of securing alliances with them. Marriage with foreign dynasties seems to have ceased in 1504, with the last marriage of a sultan to a foreign princess being that of Murad II and Mara Branković, daughter of the Serbian ruler Đurađ Branković, in 1435. By this time, the Ottomans had consolidated their power in the area and absorbed or subjugated many of their former rivals, and so marriage alliances were no longer seen as important to their foreign policy.

The Islamic principle of kafa'a discourages the marriages of women to men of differing religion or of inferior status. Neighbouring Muslim powers did not start to give their daughters in marriage to Ottoman princes until the fifteenth century, when they were seen to have grown in importance. This same principle meant that, while Ottoman men were free to marry Christian women, Muslim princesses were prevented from marrying Christian princes.

Post World War I era
There are several modern instances of intermarriage between members of
the royal families and former royal families of Islamic states (i.e., Jordan, Morocco, Saudi Arabia, the constituent states of the United Arab Emirates, etc.).

Examples include:
 Muhammad Ali, Prince of the Sa'id, son of Fuad II of Egypt and Princess Noal Zaher Shah, granddaughter of Zahir Shah of Afghanistan (2013)
 Sheik Khalid bin Hamad Al Khalifa, son of Hamad Al Khalifa, King of Bahrain and Princess Sahab bint Abdullah, daughter of Abdullah, King of Saudi Arabia (2011)
 Mohammed bin Hamad bin Mohammed Al Sharqi and Latifa bint Mohammed Al Maktoum, daughter of Mohammed bin Rashid Al Maktoum of Dubai (2009)
 Nasser bin Hamad Al Khalifa, son of Hamad Al Khalifa, King of Bahrain and Shaikha bint Mohammed Al Maktoum, daughter of Mohammed bin Rashid Al Maktoum of Dubai (2009)
 Sheik Mansour bin Zayed Al Nahyan,(half-brother of Khalifa bin Zayed Al Nahyan, Emir of Abu Dhabi and President of the United Arab Emirates (UAE) ) and Sheika Manal bint Mohammed bin Rashid Al Maktoum, daughter of Mohammed bin Rashid Al Maktoum, Emir of Dubai and Prime Minister of UAE (2005)
 Sheikh Mohammed bin Rashid Al Maktoum of Dubai and Princess Haya bint Hussein of Jordan (2004)
 Abdullah of Pahang and Tunku Azizah Aminah Maimunah of Johor (1986) 
 Ibrahim Ismail, Sultan of Johor and Raja Zarith Sofia of Perak (1982)
 Mohamed Abdel Moneim and Neslişah Sultan, granddaughter of Ottoman Sultan Mehmed VI (1940)
 Prince Nayef bin Abdullah and Princess Mihrimah Sultan, granddaughter of Ottoman Sultan Mehmed V (1940)
 Mohammad Reza Pahlavi of Iran and Princess Fawzia Fuad of Egypt (1939)
 Senije Zogu, sister of Zogu I of Albania, and Şehzade Mehmed Abid, son of Abdul Hamid II (1936)
Ahmad Al-Jaber Al-Sabah and Şükriye Sultan (1935).
 Azam Jah and Princess Durru Shehvar, daughter of Abdul Mejid II.
 Dürrüşehvar Sultan (daughter of Ottoman Caliph Abdulmejid II) and Azam Jah (son of Nizam of Hyderabad Asaf Jah VII) (1931) 

There are also numerous cases of intramarriage between cadet branches within the ruling families from the Arabian Peninsula, including the House of Saud, the House of Sabah, the House of Khalifa, the House of Thani, and the House of Busaid. Other such examples include Prince Hamzah bin Hussein and Princess Noor bint Asem (2003), Hussein of Jordan and Dina bint Abdul-Hamid (1955), Talal of Jordan and Zein Al-Sharaf Talal (1934), and Ghazi of Iraq and Aliya bint Ali (1934), all from the Hashemite dynasty.

Oceania

Hawaii
Royal incest was extremely common in the Kingdom of Hawaii and its predecessors, despite being rare in other Polynesian societies. Among the aliʻi, the ruling class, marriage between blood relatives of the first degree was believed to produce children with the highest rank under the kapu system, equal to that of the gods. A marriage between brother and sister was considered "the most perfect and revered union". It was believed that the mana of a particular aliʻi could be increased by incestuous unions. According to O. A. Bushnell, "in several accounts about Hawaiians, an ali’i who was the issue of an incestuous marriage [...] was noted for a splendid body and a superior intelligence". Writers have suggested that this preference for brother–sister incest came about as a way to protect the royal bloodline. Notable instances of incestuous relationships among Hawaiian royalty were those between King Kamehameha II and his half-sister Kamāmalu, which was a fully fledged marriage, and between Kamehameha III and his full sister Nahienaena. In the latter case, the siblings had hoped to marry but their union was opposed by Christian missionaries.

Americas

Inca Peru
The Sapa Inca of Peru frequently married their sisters, such between as the children Huayna Capac: Huascar married Chuqui Huipa, Atawallpa married Coya Asarpay, and Manco Inca married Cura Ocllo.

During and after the Spanish conquest of the Inca Empire, dynastic marriages began to occur between Inca princesses and Spanish conquistadors.  The aforementioned Cura Ocllo married Gonzalo Pizarro following the death of her brother-husband, and her sister Quispe Sisa married Francisco Pizarro.

Morganatic marriage

At one time, some dynasties adhered strictly to the concept of royal intermarriage. The Habsburgs, Sicilian and Spanish Bourbons and Romanovs, among others, introduced house laws which governed dynastic marriages; it was considered important that dynasts marry social equals (i.e., other royalty), thereby ruling out even the highest-born non-royal nobles. Those dynasts who contracted undesirable marriages often did so morganatically. Generally, this is a marriage between a man of high birth and a woman of lesser status (such as a daughter of a low-ranked noble family or a commoner). Usually, neither the bride nor any children of the marriage has a claim on the bridegroom's succession rights, titles, precedence, or entailed property. The children are considered legitimate for all other purposes and the prohibition against bigamy applies.

Examples of morganatic marriages include:
Grand Duke Konstantin Pavlovich of Russia and Countess Joanna Grudna-Grudzińska (1796)
Duke Alexander of Württemberg and Countess Claudine Rhédey von Kis-Rhéde (1835)
Prince Alexander of Hesse and by Rhine and Countess Julia Hauke (1851)
Archduke Franz Ferdinand of Austria and Countess Sophie Chotek von Chotkova und Wognin (1900)

Inbreeding

Over time, because of the relatively limited number of potential consorts, the gene pool of many ruling families grew progressively smaller, until all European royalty was related. This also resulted in many being descended from a certain person through many lines of descent, such as the numerous European royalty descended from Queen Victoria of the United Kingdom or King Christian IX of Denmark. The House of Habsburg was infamous for inbreeding, with the Habsburg lip cited as an ill effect, although no genetic evidence has proved the allegation. The closely related houses of Habsburg, Bourbon, Braganza and Wittelsbach also engaged in first-cousin unions frequently and in double-cousin and uncle-niece marriages occasionally.

When Francis II, Holy Roman Emperor married Maria Theresa of Naples and Sicily in 1790, they were double first cousins having the same set of grandparents.  Francis became the first Emperor of Austria in 1804 and dissolved the Holy Roman Empire in 1806.  All later Emperors of Austria and heads of the House of Habsburg were descendants of this union.

Examples of incestuous marriages and the impact of inbreeding on royal families include:

 All rulers of the Ptolemaic dynasty from Ptolemy II were married to their brothers and sisters, in order to keep the Ptolemaic blood "pure" and to strengthen the line of succession. Cleopatra VII (also called Cleopatra VI) and Ptolemy XIII, who married and became co-rulers of ancient Egypt following their father's death, are the most widely known example.
  King Tutankhamun's father and mother were related.
 The Persian Sassanian dynasty often married close blood relatives, partially for religious reasons (see xwedodah). One example would be Narseh, who married his sister Shapuhrdukhtag.
 Four Japanese Emperors married their sisters: namely Emperor Bidatsu, Emperor Yōmei, Emperor Kanmu, and Emperor Junna.
 Jean V of Armagnac was said to have formed a rare brother-sister liaison, left descendants and claimed to be married. There is no evidence that this "marriage" was contracted for dynastic rather than personal reasons.
 One of the most famous examples of a genetic trait aggravated by royal family intermarriage was the House of Habsburg, which inmarried particularly often and is known for the mandibular prognathism of the Habsburger (Unter) Lippe (otherwise known as the 'Habsburg jaw', 'Habsburg lip' or 'Austrian lip'"). This was typical for many Habsburg relatives over a period of six centuries.

See also
 List of coupled cousins
 Haemophilia in European royalty
 Incest
 Inbreeding
 Inbreeding depression
 Prohibited degree of kinship

Notes

References and Sources

References

Sources

 

 

 

 .

Royal families
Monarchy
Types of marriage